Hirano Station is the name of four train stations in Japan:

 Hirano Station (Fukushima)
 Hirano Station (Hyōgo)
 Hirano Station (JR West)
 Hirano Station (Osaka Metro)